is an electoral district of the Japanese House of Representatives. the district was created in 1994 as a part of the move towards single-member districts, and it is currently reprisented by the Liberal Democratic member Hideo Ōnishi.

Areas Covered

Current District 
As of 16 January 2023, the areas covered by this district are as follows:

 Edogawa 
 Chuo 1-3, Matsue 1-7, Osugi 1-5, Nishi-Ichinoe 1-4, Haruecho 4, Ichinoe 1-8, Nishimizue 4, Edogawa 4, Matsumoto 1-2
 Kasai, Tobu and Shishibone

As part of the 2022 redistricting, the former town of Komatsugawa was transferred to the 14th district.

Areas from 2017-2022 
From the second redistricting in 2017 until the third redistricting in 2022, the areas covered by this district were as follows:

 Edogawa (Koiwa, excluding Kamiishiki 1-3, Honisshiki 1-3, and Okinomiya)
 Chuo 1-4, Matsushima 1-4, Matsue 1-7, Higashikomatsugawa 1-4, Nishikomatsugawa, Osugi 1-5, Nishi Ichinoe 1-4, Haruecho 4, Ichinoe 1-8, Nishimizue 4, Edogawa 4, Matsumoto 1-2
 Within the Komatsugawa, Kasai, Tobu and Shishibone areas

As part of the 2017 redistricting, the former towns of Kamiishiki, Motoishiki and Okinomiya were all moved to the 17th district.

Areas from 2013-2017 
From the first redistricting in 2013 until the second redistricting in 2017, the areas covered by this district were as follows:

 Edogawa
 Central Office (Excluding Kami-Ishiki 3)
 Chuo 1-4, Matsushima 1-4, Matsue 1-7, Higashikomatsugawa 1-4, Nishikomatsugawa, Osugi 1-5, Nishi Ichinoe 1-4, Haruecho 4, Ichinoe (1, 8), Nishimizue 4, Edogawa 4, Matsumoto 1-2, Kamiisshiki 1-2, Honisshiki 1-3, Okinomiyacho
 Komatsugawa, Kasai, Tobu and Shishibone areas

As part of the 2013 redistricting, the area of Kamiishiki 3 was transferred to the 17th district.

Areas from before 2013 
From the creation of the district in 1994 until the first redistricting in 2013, the areas covered by this district were as follows:

 Edogawa
 Central Office
 Komatsugawa, Kasai, Tobu and Shishibone areas

Elected Representatives

Election Results 
‡ - Also ran in the Tokyo PR district

‡‡ - Also ran and won in the Tokyo PR district

References 
Edogawa, Tokyo